Contributory infringement may refer to:

 contributory patent infringement
 contributory copyright infringement